is a railway station in the town of Mitane, Yamamoto District, Akita Prefecture, Japan, operated by East Japan Railway Company (JR East).

Lines
Kado Station is served by the Ōu Main Line, and is located 338.4 km from the terminus of the line at Fukushima Station.

Station layout
Kado Station has one side platform and one island platform serving three tracks, connected by a footbridge. Track 2 is used primarily for freight trains changing direction. Kado Station is a simple consignment station, administered by Higashi-Noshiro Station, and operated by Mitane municipal authority, with point-of-sales terminal installed. Ordinary tickets, express tickets, and reserved-seat tickets for all JR lines are on sale (no connecting tickets).

Platforms

History
Kado Station was opened on August 1, 1902 as a station on the Japanese Government Railways (JGR), serving the town of Kado, Akita. The JGR became the JNR (Japan National Railways) after World War II. The station was absorbed into the JR East network upon the privatization of the JNR on April 1, 1987. A new station building was completed in July 2007.

Passenger statistics
In fiscal 2018, the station was used by an average of 135 passengers daily (boarding passengers only).

Surrounding area
 
 Kotooka Post Office 
 Kotooka Junior High School

See also
 List of railway stations in Japan

References

External links

  

Railway stations in Japan opened in 1902
Railway stations in Akita Prefecture
Ōu Main Line
Mitane, Akita